Ermanno Giglio-Tos (25 March 1865 – 18 August 1926) was an Italian entomologist.

Giglio-Tos was born at Chiaverano, Turin, and studied at the University of Turin from 1886 until 1896 under Michele Lessona. Later he was a professor at the University of Cagliari. He specialised in Diptera, Mantodea, Phasmatodea, Orthoptera and Blattodea. His collections are in the Turin Museum of Natural History.  He died, aged 61, in his home city of Turin.

Publications
Partial list
Ditteri del Messico, 4 Volumes, Turin 1892–1895
Les problèmes de la vie. Essai d'une interprétation scientifique des phénomènes vitaux, 4 Bände, Turin 1900–1910
Publisher of the magazine Biologica: Raccolta di scritti di Biologia, 1908
Una grave minaccia per Cagliari : la bonifica dello stagno di Santa Gilla proposta dall'ing. Conti-Vecchi. Cagliari 1920

References
 M. Alippi Cappelletti: Giglio-Tos, Ermanno. In: Dizionario Biografico degli Italiani, 54
 Nelson Papavero, Sergio Ibanez Bernal: Contributions to a history of Mexican dipterology – part 1. Entomologists and their work before the biologia centrali-americana. In: Acta Zoologica Mexicana. 84, 2001, S. 115–173 .

External links
BDHL Ditteri del Messico

Italian entomologists
1865 births
1926 deaths
University of Turin alumni
Academic staff of the University of Cagliari
taxa named by Ermanno Giglio-Tos